SR and related terms may refer to:

Businesses and organizations

Political organizations
 Socialist-Revolutionary Party, Russia, 1902-1940
 A Just Russia (Spravedlivaya Rossiya), a political party, formed in 2006

Transport companies
 Southern Railway (UK)
 Southern Railway (U.S.)
 Swissair (IATA airline code SR)
 Southern Railway zone
 SR Corporation

Other businesses and organizations
 Sørvágs Róðrarfelag, a Faroese rowing association
 Saarländischer Rundfunk, a German broadcaster
 Sveriges Radio, a Swedish broadcaster

Honorifics
 Senior, a generational title suffix to a man's name
 Señor, a Spanish honorific prefix, equivalent to Mr. in English
 Sister, in Catholicism

Places
 Slovakia, officially the Slovak Republic
 Socialist Republic as in USSR, ASSR, RSFSR, etc.
 Suriname (ISO 3166-1 country code SR)
 .sr, Suriname's Internet top-level domain
 West Sulawesi, Indonesia (ISO 3166-2:ID province code SR)

Science and technology

Biology and medicine
 SR protein, involved in RNA splicing
 Sarcoplasmic reticulum, a structure found within muscle cells
 Sustained release medicine

Computing and electronics
 SR flip-flop circuit, an electronic logic device
 SR programming language
 Segment routing, a form of computer networking
 Slew rate, the maximum rate of change of electrical signals
 Sound reinforcement system, making sounds louder
 Student Robotics, a robot-building competition

Transport
 Nissan SR engine
 Manx SR and SR2, 1970 US kit cars
 Lockheed SR-71 Blackbird
 Cirrus SR20 and SR22
 State Route

Other uses in science and technology
 Science Reporter, a magazine
 Special relativity, a theory in physics
 Steradian, the SI unit of solid angle
 Strontium, symbol Sr, a chemical element

Sport
 Strike rate, a statistic in Cricket

Other uses
 Saudi riyal, the currency of Saudi Arabia
 Serbian language (ISO-639-1 language code sr)
 Slot receiver, a position in American football
 Special reconnaissance, a military tactic
 Special Reconnaissance (United States Air Force) the special warfare group that conducts weather intelligence and unconventional warfare
 "Sr.", a 2022 film featuring Roberts Downey Jr. and Sr.

See also
 Gibbs SR, a brand of toothpaste
 
 Senior (disambiguation)